Soula may refer to:

People
 Abdel Salem Ben Magh Soula (born 1961), Algerian handball player
 Marc Soula (1945–2012), French entomologist
 Racha Soula (born 1994), Tunisian rower

Places

Burkina Faso
 Soula, Bazèga, village in the Kombissiri Department of Bazèga Province in central Burkina Faso
 Soula, Boulkiemdé, town in the Thyou Department of Boulkiemdé Province in central western Burkina Faso
 Soula, Gnagna, town in the Coalla Department of Gnagna Province in eastern Burkina Faso

France
 Soula, Ariège, commune in the Ariège department in southwestern France

Other
 Malo Soula, 1996 album by Serbian pop duo K2

See also
 Soulas